Gilbert Francis Lani Damian Kauhi (October 17, 1937 – May 3, 2004), also known by the stage names Zulu and Zoulou, was an American actor and comedian.  He is remembered largely for his portrayal of Kono Kalakaua on the long-running television program Hawaii Five-O.

Career
Kauhi was born in Hilo on the "Big Island" of Hawaii. He served in the United States Coast Guard.  He began his career in Honolulu as a stand-up comedian, mimic, and singer, described by one journalist as "part Godfrey Cambridge, part Zero Mostel".  His nightly live show was a popular attraction at C'est Si Bon Supper Club in the Waikiki section of Honolulu before, during, and well after his brief television career. Kauhi was an accomplished surfer; he was known in Hawaii by the honorific "Waikiki Beach Boy." In the late 1960s, Kauhi was a member of the band Sons of Hawaii and referred to it as his "schooling in Hawaiian music".

In 1968, Zulu landed the role of the burly state police detective Kono on Hawaii Five-O.  He was fired from the show after four seasons after disagreements with the show's publicist. Supposedly, a racial slur was used and Jack Lord had him fired. He was also frustrated by the "dumb Hawaiian" image that his character projected, as well as off-camera conflicts with the show's star, Jack Lord.  "[Lord] ... wouldn't let him do anything," said a co-worker. 

"My friends think I'm a trained-animal act," he said, in a 1971 interview. " 'Yes, boss; no, boss.'  Well, some day this animal will be laughing all the way to the bank." Zulu would go on to eight more television roles including a reprise role of Kono in the 1997 pilot for the revival series, Hawaii Five-0.  He later hosted a Honolulu show called Big Z Movie Time.

The show helped launch a successful nightclub career. In 1971, he signed a $2.5 million contract to appear at C'est Si Bon Showroom in the Pagoda Hotel and Restaurant. After leaving Hawaii Five-O (1968), he wound up as a headliner for several years at Duke Kahanamoukou's in the International Market Place. After he left there in 1972, he performed at neighbor island hotels and did benefits. Zulu also worked on American Hawaii Cruise ships for a while as part of the Cruise Staff.

After ending his business relationship with his manager, Kauhi discovered that she had registered the name "Zulu" and he could not perform as Zulu without her permission. For the rest of his career he performed as "Zoulou", saying it was the French Tahitian spelling.

Death
Kauhi died in Hilo at the age of 66 from complications due to diabetes. Per his wishes, his ashes were scattered off Waikiki.

Filmography

 Rampage (1963) – guard to the tribal leader
Hawaii Five-O (1968–1972) (95 episodes) – Kono
Uncredited 
I Sailed to Tahiti with an All Girl Crew (1968) – Jail guard
The Brian Keith Show (1972–1973) (3 episodes) – Chief Hanamakii / Zulu
Code Name: Diamond Head (1977) – Zulu
The Paradise Connection (1979) – Rudy
Charlie's Angels (1981) – Kono (uncredited)
Magnum, P.I. (1982) – Hotel Doorman
Hawaii Five-O (1997 pilot for revival series) – Kono (final film role)

References

External links
 

1937 births
2004 deaths
American male television actors
Deaths from diabetes
Male actors from Hawaii
Native Hawaiian musicians
Native Hawaiian people
People from Hilo, Hawaii
Male actors from Honolulu
20th-century American male actors
20th-century American musicians